Honi Soit is the student newspaper of the University of Sydney. First published in 1929, the newspaper is produced by an elected editorial team and a select group of reporters sourced from the university's populace. The name is an abbreviation of the Anglo-Norman "Honi soit qui mal y pense" ("Shame upon him who thinks evil of it").

Layout

Format and organisation 

Published as part of the activities of the Students' Representative Council (SRC), Honi Soit is a tabloid-style publication incorporating a mixture of humorous and serious opinion articles.

Issues are published weekly during university semesters, typically containing a topical feature article and interview, letters to the editor, campus news, pop culture articles and news satire. Special editions are published yearly, including Election Honi, devoted towards covering the annual Students' Representative Council elections, Women's Honi dedicated to feminism and women's issues, and Queer Honi, dedicated to covering LGBT issues. The final edition each year is typically presented as a spoof or parody of an existing newspaper. These editions were traditionally sold on the streets of Sydney to raise money for charity as part of the university's Commemoration Day festivities, though this practice has been discontinued since the 1970s.

Honi Soit is the only student newspaper in Australia that remains a weekly publication.

Comedy 

Honi has a strong history of irreverence, often printing humorous and satiric stories alongside traditional journalistic pieces. This has in turn inspired breakaway satiric publications Oz magazine and The Chaser.

It has become tradition for the final pages of the paper to be presented as a satirical newspaper, most frequently going by the name of The Garter Press, a play on the Order of the Garter from which Honi Soit derives its name.

Editors

The office of editor is highly sought after, and was originally filled by single honorary appointment for outstanding merit in the field of writing. Since the 1980s editors have been annually elected by fellow students as a "ticket" of up to 10 editors during SRC elections, with two or more groups campaigning for the role. Guest editors will normally be nominated for the annual Women's and Queer editions by the relevant interest groups on campus.

For a time editors of the paper were given a yearly scholarship of £100 (roughly equivalent to $2,700 in 2014) (until 1966) by media tycoon Rupert Murdoch, and the SRC began to pay editors a small allowance instead from this point on.

Notable past editors include Lex Banning, Bob Ellis, Verity Firth, Laurie Oakes, Kip Williams, Craig Reucassel, and Keith Windschuttle.

History

Founding 

Honi Soit was created in 1929 to counterbalance ongoing criticism of Sydney University's students in the Australian media, which came to a head when students were alleged to have dressed a soldier's statue in women's underwear during a graduation festival. The Sydney Morning Herald referred to the incident as a "vulgar desecration", and students were described as "educated louts" for their actions.

An early edition of Honi sought to address the ongoing outrage with the stinging retort:

"We expected gross exaggeration, and even invention, from certain Sydney journals. What we did not expect was that the journals which can generally be relied upon for sane, safe news would also exaggerate and distort in such a manner as to utterly mislead the general public... Even our apology was sneered at."

The new paper sought to paint the undergraduate varsity in a more favorable light, giving voice to the student's successes and their progressive opinions, a role which it has continued to pursue to the present.

Cultural developments 

With the onset of the Great Depression, the rise of the Labour movement, and the growth of the civil rights revolution Honi'''s left-wing and often radical voice helped the publication grow from its roots as a small university publication, with the paper and its alumni eventually playing a pivotal role in the culture of both Australia and Britain.

An important line of demarcation for Honi came in the 1960s with editors Richard Walsh and Peter Grose's premature resignation to found Oz magazine, a humorous publication in Australia and (later) Britain which came into conflict with legal authorities in both countries. However, Oz did play a strong role in defining the comedic and radical sensibilities of future generations of Honi.Honi became intricately associated with the Sydney Push during the 1960s, turning its focus from arts to politics for the first time, and a number of radical editors followed Walsh's tenure.

In 1967 Honi was implicated in the development of the Anti-Vietnam movement in Australia, being blamed for road blockades that led to the infamous "run the bastards over" affair during a visit by American President Lyndon B. Johnson. The paper was described as "filthy and scurrilous" in the Legislative Council of NSW for their stance against the war, and former editor Richard Walsh was denied entry to the United States in 1966 for his outspokenness on the issue. Despite this, the tide of public opinion eventually turned in Honi's favour as the Vietnam War progressed, largely vindicating their editorial position (see Opposition to the Vietnam War, Public opinion).

Being a left-wing student publication also put Honi at the forefront of the civil rights movement in Australia, with editorial content often directed towards defending the rights of Women, people of colour, LGBT people, and adherents of communism, at times when such views were still widely controversial.

The radicalism of Honi during the 1960s was not without its consequences. By 1967 the paper found itself without willing advertisers to fund its publication, and faced calls for its disestablishment from members of the University Senate. However the SRC declared the paper had become far too important to let it perish, and provided temporary funding on the condition that the publication be restructured back towards a more traditional newspaper, instating conservative editor Keith Windschuttle to placate critics.

Modern dayHoni retains its position in the Australian media landscape as a hub of counter-cultural journalism and left-wing activism, though its long list of preeminent alumni and position as a leading student publication have somewhat softened its public image, being described by The Sydney Morning Herald as a "venerable institution" in 2013. Current incarnations are comparable to the American publication Vice for their blend of arts, news and cultural reporting.

Alumni
Since its inception Honi has been an important training ground for many Australian journalists, politicians, satirist, writers, and entertainers. Former contributors include art critic Robert Hughes, poet Les Murray, film-maker Bruce Beresford, OZ magazine co-founder Richard Walsh, media personality Clive James, feminist Germaine Greer, journalists Bob Ellis and Laurie Oakes, Prime Minister Malcolm Turnbull, High Court Judge Michael Kirby, author Madeleine St John, historian Keith Windschuttle, theatre director Kip Williams, intellectual Donald Horne, broadcaster Adam Spencer, philosopher George Molnar, various members of comedy troupe The Chaser, and journalist Avani Dias.

Former Prime Minister Tony Abbott has named Honi Soit as the impetus for his initial entry into politics, having been inspired to begin writing to the paper by a "quirky" edition which "demonstrated how to build a nuclear bomb".

Controversies
As a counter-cultural publication, Honi has a long history of generating controversy dating back to its founding issue. The constant controversy surrounding the paper was lampooned in a 1967 edition which contained a cutout "special libel coupon" that would make it easier for readers to "sue Honi Soit for all it's got (two battered typewriters)".

The St Michael's College hoax
In 2009 Honi published a feature article, 'The Mystery of St Michael's' later uncovered as a hoax, which claimed a fire in 1992 at St Michael's College, a now derelict residential college adjacent to the university's Architecture building, had killed 16 students. It was implied that a cover-up by the Catholic Church had stifled widespread awareness of the tragedy. Editors were later forced to retract the story.

"Vagina Soit"
In August 2013, the newspaper made international headlines after printing a cover featuring photographs of 18 vulvae. The newspaper was pulled from stands within hours after it was decided the censoring of the images was not sufficient. This was due to the fact that black bars placed over certain parts of the vulvae were not completely opaque.

A statement released by the female editors stated 'We are tired of society giving us a myriad of things to feel about our own bodies. We are tired of having to attach anxiety to our vaginas. We are tired of vaginas being either artificially sexualised (porn) or stigmatised (censorship and airbrushing). We are tired of being pressured to be sexual, and then being shamed for being sexual.'

Allegations against Tony Abbott
The paper became a point of contention in the lead up to the 2013 Australian federal election, as a standing record of the allegedly violent and anti-social conduct of Prime Ministerial candidate Tony Abbott during his time at University. Abbott became the 28th Prime Minister of Australia.

ANZAC Day criticism
In 1958 Honi caused a media outrage over a story calling for the end of the ANZAC Day holiday. The paper argued that the national holiday was no longer treated as a veneration to the casualties of war, but rather as a national celebration and an excuse for inebriation, backing up the claims with photographs of drunken revellers at memorial events. Despite widespread calls from the media for the editor to be sacked, the SRC resisted The affair was the basis for the play The One Day of the Year by Alan Seymour.

A report by the Department of Veterans' Affairs in 2012 found the prevailing public sentiment to agree with the allegations made by Honi, with participants stating the "excessive use of alcohol and 'yobbo' behavior... detract from the original spirit of the day and negatively impact on the veteran commemorations".

Pro-North Korea Article
In August 2018, Honi gained media attention when it emerged that they had published an article by former University of Sydney lecturer Jay Tharappel, which praised the regime in North Korea. Tharappel's article claimed that North Korea was an "egalitarian" society, which was benefiting from the "past sacrifice" of its citizens and remained "necessarily authoritarian" due to its antagonism with the United States.

The article drew further criticism from Jewish organisations, after it became known Tharappel had engaged in alleged antisemitic behaviour, including making tendentious comments on Facebook about the Holocaust. The 2018 editors refused to retract the article.

Other controversies
In 1945 the Christian Societies of the university drew media attention after they called for the paper's editors to be sacked for publishing information about birth control, and for misquoting the Bible. These complaints were supported by the then Rector of St John's College who suggested its distributors be arrested, though police did not pursue the matter.

In 1950 printers Consolidated Press refused to produce an edition of Honi due to an article relating to an employee of the Commonwealth Police (now the Australian Security Intelligence Organisation and the Australian Federal Police), for fear it constituted a breach of national security.

In 1952 fights broke out at Sydney University, including in the Honi Soit office, after the newspaper published reports of drunkenness and savage hazing rituals at the university's ecclesiastical colleges. The brawls were caused by members of the colleges attempting to remove the paper from circulation, going so far as to chase a truck delivering copies out of the university grounds. Police were eventually called in to control the situation.

In 1970 Honi published confidential intelligence files that showed the Australian Security Intelligence Organisation had blocked the appointment of one of its former editors, Hall Greenland, from a job in the public service. Greenland went on to become a Walkley Award-winning journalist.Honi Soit was frequently in conflict with the police from the 1950s through to the 1970s for publication of what was considered indecent material, generally depicting nudity or erotica in various forms, often published to specifically antagonise the authorities. Having won over public opinion by the mid 1970s, Honi continued its practice of occasionally featuring nudity up until the 1990s with little interference.

In 1995 the editors (including The Chaser's Charles Firth) used their colour pages to create an advertisement for Union Board candidate Nick Purtell. The editors were fined $360 (the cost of an advertisement) and asked to apologise for the misuse of advertising space. The editors printed an apology in size 4 font, then ran a full page ad in support of their actions. Mr Purtell did not manage to get elected. This incident was recalled by Charles Firth in the ABC documentary Uni.

In 1995, Honi Soit reprinted a controversial article from Rabelais Student Media, its La Trobe University counterpart, entitled "The Art of Shoplifting"—one of seven student newspapers to do so in the wake of Rabelais editors being prosecuted by state censors.

In their last edition for 2005, the editors produced "Hx", an imitation of the free "Mx" tabloid. They used their colour pages to present a biting satire of quality commercial media, with rarely seen images of dead and wounded Iraqis juxtaposed against vacuous magazine style copy, such as "Fashion From the Front Line". The inclusion of images of dead and mutilated civilian casualties shocked many readers. This same year the paper was accused of having turned from its radical roots by comedian Jonathan Biggins after it published a critical recap of his Wharf Revue.

De-classified U.S. National Security Agency documents were published by Honi in 2013, which showed the paper had been suspected by intelligence agencies of operating under Soviet influence.

In 2016 the editors produced a satire spoof of broadsheet newspaper The Australian'' for their last edition for the year. The issue, complete with replica masthead, featured a front-page splash about Rupert Murdoch dying and satirical parody opinion pieces from journalists at the paper. The prank was acknowledged by The Australian's CEO Nicholas Gray.

References

External links
"Honi Soit" official website site.
Honi Soit 1929 – 1990, University of Sydney Library

Student newspapers published in Australia
University of Sydney
Publications established in 1929
Newspapers published in Sydney
Weekly newspapers published in Australia